Helena Suková was the defending champion but lost in the second round to Pascale Paradis.

Martina Navratilova won in the final 6–2, 6–2 against Natasha Zvereva.

Seeds
A champion seed is indicated in bold text while text in italics indicates the round in which that seed was eliminated.

  Martina Navratilova (champion)
  Pam Shriver (third round)
  Gabriela Sabatini (quarterfinals)
  Helena Suková (second round)
  Natasha Zvereva (final)
 n/a
  Lori McNeil (third round)
  Claudia Kohde-Kilsch (third round)
  Zina Garrison (third round)
  Larisa Savchenko (quarterfinals)
  Mary Joe Fernández (semifinals)
  Barbara Potter (third round)
  Raffaella Reggi (third round)
  Patty Fendick (first round)
  Catarina Lindqvist (quarterfinals)
  Dianne Balestrat (third round)

Draw

Finals

Top half

Section 1

Section 2

Bottom half

Section 3

Section 4

References
 1988 Pilkington Glass Championships Draw

Eastbourne International
1988 WTA Tour